John Jacob Schaub House is a historic home located in C. G. Hill Memorial Park at Pfafftown, Forsyth County, North Carolina.  It was built in 1829–1830, and is a two-story, two bay by two bay, single pile brick dwelling.  It features a Georgian style interior design and exterior end chimneys with stepped shoulders and decorative caps.  It was built by John Jacob Schaub, a member of the Unitas Fratrum, or Moravian Church.

It was listed on the National Register of Historic Places in 1982.

References

External links
C.G. Hill Memorial Park website

Houses on the National Register of Historic Places in North Carolina
Georgian architecture in North Carolina
Houses completed in 1830
Houses in Forsyth County, North Carolina
National Register of Historic Places in Forsyth County, North Carolina
1830 establishments in North Carolina